The R Class are diesel locomotives built by English Electric, Rocklea for the Western Australian Government Railways in 1968. They were followed by the revised RA class.

Description
The R class were a hood type general purpose diesel-electric locomotive. They were similar to the Queensland Railways 1300 class. All equipment, except traction motors, were interchangeable with the standard gauge K class. 
The bogies are an English Electric design with low weight transfer characteristics. They feature fully equalised primary spring gear, all traction motors in each bogie mounted with the nose-suspension facing inwards, traction thrust at near axle level and long pivot centres to reduce inter-bogie transfer. Adhesion loss at maximum tractive effort is limited to 4.5 per cent allowing  trailing load to be hauled up a 1 in 100 grade.

History
All were fitted with dynamic brakes.

Class list

References

Railway Transportation, April 1968

Co-Co locomotives
English Electric locomotives
Diesel locomotives of Western Australia
Railway locomotives introduced in 1968
3 ft 6 in gauge locomotives of Australia
Diesel-electric locomotives of Australia